The 2009–10 season of Hull City is the club's second season in the Premier League. Home games were played at the KC Stadium, which has a capacity of 25,404. City had finished the 2008–09 season in 17th place in the table, successfully avoiding relegation by a margin of one point over Newcastle.

Players

Current squad 
Updated 9 May 2010.

Squad statistics
Updated 14 May 2010.

 

All statistics below are correct as of 31 August 2009 and only Premier League games are included in the list below.
Top goal scorer: Stephen Hunt, 2
Most assists: Jozy Altidore, 1
Most Shots on target: Geovanni, 5
Most Red Cards: None yet, 0
Most Yellow Cards: Stephen Hunt, 2
Most fouls: Stephen Hunt, 9

Starting 11
Considering starts in all competitions
Considering a 4-4-2 formation

Transfers
In

Out

Loans
In

Out

Awards
Stephen Hunt was named as player of the year and also took the first Tigers Player trophy.
George Boateng came second and Andy Dawson came third.
Andy Dawson was awarded players' player of the year, with Mark Cullen taking the Young Player of the Year award.

Tom Cairney's goal against Everton in March being voted goal of the season.

Non-playing staff

Updated 7 June 2010.
Manager: Iain Dowie
Assistant Manager: Tim Flowers
First Team Coach: Steve Parkin
First Team Coach: Steve Wigley
Goalkeeping Coach: Mark Prudhoe
Reserve Team Coach: Aidan Davison
Development Coach: Stuart Watkiss
Head of Youth: Billy Russell
Fitness Coordinator: Sean Rush
Sports Psychologist: Mark Nesti
ProZone Consultant/Performance Analyst: Laurence Stewart
Chief Scout: Bob Shaw
Youth Recruitment Officer: Neil Mann
Football in the Community Officer: John Davies
Enterprise Co-Ordinator: Andy McMillan
Head Physiotherapist: Simon Maltby
Assistant Physiotherapist: Liam McGarry
Kit Manager: Barry Lowe
Club Secretary: Phil Hough

Kits

For the 2009–10 season Hull used the most common black and amber stripes as their home kit. They used a blue coloured shirt as their away shirt. The goalkeeper kit was green. Hull's kit was produced by Umbro and all the shirts had totesport.com printed on the front as the sponsor.

Preseason

Preseason training 
Hull's preseason training took the tigers back to Bormio, Italy once more this time just for five days. Boaz Myhill spoke out saying it was hard work but essential. Injured Ian Ashbee was present in Bormio after he had a knee brace fitted and he was working to "Get the strength back in his leg". On day five in Bormio the tigers training include a 16 km bike ride. On the final day the team took part in a bike ride and further training along with massages with light training.

Winger Jerome Thomas joined Hull in part of their preseason training on a 10-day trial however he was not signed. On Hull's trip to China to play in the Barclays Beijing Asia Trophy and they trained at the Workers Stadium.

Preseason friendlies

Barclays Asia Trophy
On 10 June 2009, Hull City were officially announced as part of the Barclays Asia Trophy 2009. In this 4-team tournament Hull City competed against two English sides, Tottenham Hotspur and West Ham United, as well local side Beijing Guoan, who they beat 5–4 on a penalty shoot out after a 1–1 draw.
On 31 July 2009, Hull City faced Tottenham Hotspur in the final of the Barclays Asia Trophy and were defeated 3–0.

Premier League

Hull's second season in the top tier of English Football in their 105-year history.

August–December
On 29 October 2009 chairman Paul Duffen resigned his position with the club and was replaced by former chairman Adam Pearson on 2 November 2009.

January–June
On 15 March 2010 manager Phil Brown was relieved of his duties after a run of four defeats left Hull in the relegation zone. On 17 March 2010 Brown's replacement was named as former Crystal Palace and Charlton Athletic boss, Iain Dowie.  Dowie's first move as manager was to bring Tim Flowers and Steve Wigley onto his backroom staff, with former Hull City assistant manager Brian Horton joining Phil Brown on gardening leave.
Phil Brown's contract as manager was confirmed ended on 7 June 2010.

Results

Results by round

Final league table

Records
Top Goalscorer
Stephen Hunt

Assists 

Appearances 

Attendance
Average: 
Highest: 
Lowest:

FA Cup

Summary
On Sunday 29 November the draw for the F.A. Cup third round was made, Hull City were drawn away to fellow Premier League side Wigan Athletic.

Results

Records
Top Goalscorer

Assists 

Appearances 

Attendance
Average:
Highest:
Lowest:

League Cup

Summary
On 12 August the draw for the League Cup second round was made. Hull were seeded so they couldn't get another Premier League side. Hull City were drawn at home to Football League One side Southend United.
The match took place at the KC stadium on 25 August 2009 with Hull quickly off the mark with Tom Cairney scoring after seven minutes. They went further ahead from a Nicky Barmby free-kick which Jozy Altidore hit in. Southend replied minutes later on half-time through Franck Moussa. In the second half Geovanni came on and scored giving Hull a 3–1 victory putting then into the League Cup third round. The draw took place on 29 August 2009 and Hull were drawn at home to fellow Premier League team Everton.
The game took place on 23 September 2009 at the KC Stadium. Hull lost the game 0–4 ending their cup run for this season.

Results

Records
Top Goalscorer

Assists 

Appearances 

Attendance
Average:
Highest:
Lowest:

Friendlies

See also
 Hull City A.F.C. seasons

References

External links
 BBC Sport: Hull City fixture list 2009-10 

2009-10
2009–10 Premier League by team
2009-10 Hull City A.F.C. Season